The WSA World Series 2013 is a series of women's squash tournaments which are part of the Women's Squash Association (WSA) World Tour for the 2013 squash season. The WSA World Series tournaments are some of the most prestigious events on the women's tour. Nicol David won the 2013 WSA World Series followed by Laura Massaro and Raneem El Weleily.

WSA World Series Ranking Points
WSA World Series events also have a separate World Series ranking. Points for this are calculated on a cumulative basis after each World Series event.

2013 Tournaments

World Series Standings 2013

See also
PSA World Series 2013
WSA World Tour 2013
Official Women's Squash World Ranking

References

External links 
 WSA World Series Standings website
 WSA Tour Rules

WSA World Tour seasons
2013 in squash